Lakeview Cemetery is a burial ground located off of North Avenue in Burlington, Chittenden County, Vermont.  The cemetery was created in 1867 and dedicated in 1871, and overlooks Lake Champlain.  It is near the current campus of Burlington High School.

Details
Lakeview Cemetery is a non-denominational cemetery owned by the city of Burlington.  The cemetery's Louisa Howard Chapel is available for rent, and is frequently used for marriage ceremonies, funerals, memorial services, music recitals, and other functions.  The city government's management of the cemetery is aided by the Friends of Lakeview Cemetery, a group formed in the early 1990s to plan improvements to the cemetery buildings and grounds and raise money to carry them out.

History
Lakeview Cemetery was established in 1867 when the city of Burlington purchased 23 acres of land from H. B. Sawyer for $3,500 (about $65,000 in 2019).  In 1868, the city purchased an additional seven from J. A. Arthur for $2,000 (about $38,000 in 2019).

The cemetery was planned in the rural cemetery style that became popular in the mid-1800s.  Located at what was then the outskirts of the city and situated near the end of the city's trolley car line, Lakeview included many of the attributes of a park.  Its narrow, meandering roads, benches, and specimen trees helped make it an outdoor destination for city dwellers, who visited for picnics and other activities.

In the 1880s, philanthropist Louisa Howard financed the construction of a small church on the cemetery grounds.  When the stone Victorian Gothic Revival building was dedicated in 1882, it was named in her honor.  The Louisa Howard Chapel fell into disuse during the 1940s, but in the 1990s a group of interested individuals formed Friends of Lakeview Cemetery, which raised funds to refurbish it.  By 2004, the group had raised $100,000, and the chapel underwent a restoration that was completed in 2006.  Other improvements and restorations undertaken by Friends of Lakeview Cemetery include construction of a new gazebo in 2010 to replace an original that had fallen into disrepair.  The new cedar wood gazebo was crafted by hand in the 19th Century Adirondack Architecture style so that it resembled the original.

Lakeview's grounds included three fountains that were donated in the 1870s by John P. Howard (Louisa Howard's brother). In 2014, Friends of Lakeview Cemetery completed restoration of the fountains, using the remnants of the originals and a photo from a vintage postcard for reference.

Interments
Burials at Lakeview Cemetery include veterans of every major conflict since the American Civil War, including several members of the 54th Massachusetts Infantry Regiment, a Union Army regiment of African American soldiers and white officers.  Several soldiers who served at nearby Fort Ethan Allen in the late 1800s and early 1900s are buried at Lakeview, including members of the famed 10th Cavalry Regiment (Buffalo Soldiers).

Notable burials
Many notable political and military leaders and other prominent individuals are interred at Lakeview Cemetery, to include:

Harold J. Arthur, Vermont governor
Warren Austin, US Senator and first US ambassador to the United Nations
Milo Lyman Bennett, associate justice of the Vermont Supreme Court
Rufus E. Brown, attorney general of Vermont
Chauncey W. Brownell, Vermont secretary of state
Lucius E. Chittenden, author and public official
George E. Davis, recipient of the Medal of Honor during the American Civil War
Louis F. Dow, mayor of Burlington
Albert S. Drew, mayor of Burlington
David J. Foster, US Congressman
George P. Foster, Union Army officer during the American Civil War who attained the rank of brigadier general by brevet
Aaron H. Grout, Vermont secretary of state
Seneca Haselton, associate justice of the Vermont Supreme Court
Joseph D. Hatch, state legislator and mayor of Burlington
Donly C. Hawley, mayor of Burlington
Doc Hazelton, major league baseball player and college baseball coach
William W. Henry, Union Army officer in the American Civil War who attained the rank of brevet brigadier general and received the Medal of Honor
Oliver Otis Howard, US Army major general who received the Medal of Honor for heroism while serving in the Union Army during the American Civil War
Hollister Jackson, lieutenant governor of Vermont
Horatio Nelson Jackson, first person to completely cross the United States by automobile
John Holmes Jackson, mayor of Burlington
Job Lyman, Vermont Auditor of Accounts
Henry T. Mayo, US Navy admiral who commanded the Atlantic Fleet during World War I
George H. Morse, mayor of Burlington
Hamilton S. Peck, state legislator and judge, mayor of Burlington
Theodora Agnes Peck, novelist and poet
Theodore S. Peck, Union Army officer who received the Medal of Honor for American Civil War heroism
William S. Peirce, United States Army brigadier general
E. Henry Powell, Vermont Auditor of Accounts
Max L. Powell, President pro tempore of the Vermont State Senate
Robert Roberts, mayor of Burlington
George J. Stannard, Union Army major general whose brigade was credited with breaking Pickett's Charge at the Battle of Gettysburg
Elliot M. Sutton, mayor of Burlington
William J. Van Patten, businessman, philanthropist, Burlington mayor, and President pro tempore of the Vermont Senate
William Wells, Union Army major general by brevet who received the Medal of Honor for heroism at the Battle of Gettysburg
Urban A. Woodbury, governor of Vermont

References

Sources

Newspapers

Internet

External links
Lakeview Cemetery (City of Burlington official website)
Burlington Cemetery Commission, website for the board that manages Burlington, Vermont's cemeteries
Lakeview Cemetery at Find A Grave
Friends of Lakeview Cemetery on Facebook

Rural cemeteries
Cemeteries in Vermont
1867 establishments in Vermont
Tourist attractions in Burlington, Vermont
Buildings and structures in Burlington, Vermont
Burials at Lakeview Cemetery (Burlington, Vermont)